The Dancer Barberina (German: Die Tänzerin Barberina) is a 1920 German silent historical drama film directed by Carl Boese and starring Lyda Salmonova, Otto Gebühr, and Harry Liedtke. Part of the group of Prussian films of the Weimar and Nazi eras, it portrays the relationship between Frederick the Great and the dancer Barberina Campanini in eighteenth century Prussia. Gebühr starred as Frederick in another film on the subject, The Dancer of Sanssouci (1932).

The film's sets were designed by the art director Ernst Stern.

Cast
Lyda Salmonova as Tänzerin Barberina Campanini
Otto Gebühr as Friedrich II
Harry Liedtke as dance teacher Fossano 
Reinhold Schünzel as Prince von Carignan 
Rosa Valetti as Frau Campanini 
Julius Falkenstein as Argenson 
Paul Hartmann as Sohn von Lord Stuart 
Giorgio de Giorgetti as King Louis XV of France
Paul Czimeg as Kammerdiener Friedr. Michaelis 
Franz Groß as Bachelier, Kammerdiener 
Grete Hollmann as Crichton's daughter
Ludwig Rex as Reeder Josuah Crichton 
Max Ruhbeck as Lord Stuart
Emil Stammer

References

External links

1920s historical drama films
German historical drama films
Films of the Weimar Republic
Films directed by Carl Boese
German silent feature films
German black-and-white films
Prussian films
Films set in the 1740s
Cultural depictions of Frederick the Great
Cultural depictions of Louis XV
1920s dance films
1920 drama films
Silent historical drama films
1920s German films
1920s German-language films